Depressaria tenebricosa is a moth of the family Depressariidae. It is found in Spain, Portugal, Italy, Croatia, Romania, North Macedonia and Greece. It has also been recorded from Israel and Asia Minor.

The larvae feed on Conopodium majus.

References

External links
lepiforum.de

Moths described in 1854
Depressaria
Moths of Europe
Moths of Asia